Novy Kuganak (Yañı Quğanaq) is a rural locality (a village) in Starobabichevsky Selsoviet, Karmaskalinsky District, Bashkortostan, Russia. The population was 76 as of 2010. There is 1 street.

Geography 
Novy Kuganak is located 11 km south of Karmaskaly (the district's administrative centre) by road. Karlamanbash is the nearest rural locality.

References 

Rural localities in Karmaskalinsky District